Parcieux is a commune in the Ain department in eastern France. It lies just north of Lyon.

Population

Its inhabitants are known as Parcevins.

See also
Communes of the Ain department

References

External links

 Louise Labé à Parcieux
 La Dombes et la ville de Parcieux

Communes of Ain
Ain communes articles needing translation from French Wikipedia